Objective Systems Integrators (OSI) is a multinational computer technology corporation that develops, manufactures, licenses, and supports software products which automate the monitoring, control, delivery, and management of services for multinational corporation service providers including:
 Wireless service providers
 IPTV service providers
 Transmission service providers
OSI was acquired by MYCOM and MYCOM OSI was formed in 2014.

History

Sobha Group ownership 
OSI, a wholly owned subsidiary of the Sobha Group, develops and markets an OSS suite targeted for Communications Service Providers.

February 2008, Longview Software and OSI sign an Asset Purchase Agreement for OSI to acquire Longview intellectual property, products and technology. Longview software is a maker of off-the-shelf tools and custom applications that add value to many Operational Support System (OSS) and Business Support System (BSS) frameworks in the telecommunications industry.

Agilent Technologies ownership 
Agilent acquired OSI in January 2001 for approximately $665 million. Agilent subsequently built an OSS business around this and other technology, but decided in 2007 to exit this market segment and focus on its test and measurement and life sciences businesses.

2001–2007, OSI is acquired by Agilent Technologies to help integrate Test and Measurement into the OSS market. OSI was under Agilent's OSS Division (Assurance Services Division) as a NETeXPERT Business Unit.

Pre-Agilent history 
During the period of 1995–2001, OSI was traded on NASDAQ as OSII.  OSI introduces the MASTER series of products to the market aligned around key technology areas such as fixed line networks, SONET/SDH network, and wireless networks.  In 1997 OSI reached its 100th worldwide communications service provider (CSP) customer base.

1998–2001, OSI’s NetExpert Virtual Service Management (VSM), and Virtual Process Management (VPM) frameworks leverage the UMA (Unified Management Architecture).  OSI introduces several new applications in key Communications Service Provider functional areas namely  Fault management, Performance Management, Configuration Management, and Accounting Management.

Products
OSI launches NetExpert Neon May 2009 for service assurance solutions focused on services and customers:
Service Health - Service Quality and Impact management leveraging industry standard portal technology for a holistic view of critical customer services.
Customer Health - Customer SLA, Experience Analysis, and Insight of corporations, groups within corporations, and individuals.

See also 
 Agilent Technologies
 Sobha Renaissance Information Technology
 Operations support systems
 Communications Service Provider
 Service management
 Expert system

Reference Books 
Plunkett, J (1996). "Plunkett's Infotech Industry Almanac" - Page 75 Books
Minoli, D, Golway, T, and Smith, N (1996) "Planning and Managing ATM Networks" - Google Books Prentice Hall PTR.
Terplan, K (1998). "Telecom Operations Management Solutions with NetExpert" Amazon,Google Books CRC Press LLC
Terplan, K (1999). "Web-Based Systems & Network Management" - Page 185 Google Books
Terplan, K (1999). "Applications for Distributed Systems and Network Management" - Page 101 Google Books
Van Nostrand Reinhold

References

Telecommunications companies of the United States
Telephony software
Software companies based in California
Defunct software companies of the United States